Tara Mandal is a fictional character from the British ITV soap opera Coronation Street, portrayed by Ayesha Dharker.

Creation
Her creation and casting were first announced on 22 August 2008, one month after Coronation Street was lambasted in a report by chairman of the Equality and Human Rights Commission Trevor Phillips for being "too white". The report criticised the show's tokenism in having existing Asian character Dev Alahan fill the stereotypical role of shopkeeper.

However, in the 14 April 2009 edition of TV Times, it was reported that the character had been axed from the show and would depart screens the following month.

Storylines
Tara meets Dev at a dinner party thrown by her parents Prem (Madhav Sharma) and Nina (Harvey Virdi). Several weeks later, she visits Dev's apartment to discuss business matters on her father's behalf. It is evident that there was an attraction between the pair. They are interrupted by a jealous Nina who warns Dev to stay away from her daughter. After Nina leaves, Tara tries to kiss Dev but he rejects her, leaving Tara embarrassed.

Tara invites Dev to her house after asking for Prem's consent to the relationship. The two are about to share a kiss when Prem and Nina walk in. Dev is forced to end his relationship with Tara after he admits to Prem that he had been sleeping with Nina, as Prem and Dev agreed that Tara would not know of the affair. However, Tara reconciles with Dev and they resume their relationship. Tara later discovers that her ex-boyfriend had been having a fling with her mother while they were together. Further heartbreak follows when Dev's daughter Amber (Nikki Patel) exposes Dev and Nina's affair, which results in the end of their relationship.

On Boxing Day 2008, Amber sets Dev and Tara up on a date in The Rovers Return Inn, Amber tells Tara she has relationship problems with Darryl Morton (Jonathan Dixon) and that she wants advice, whilst telling Dev she wants a drink. Dev sells Tara the corner shop flat, as it is empty and Tara needs accommodation. She gladly accepts. Tara gives Amber a car as a belated birthday present. However, Dev is against this. Amber is offered a job by Darryl, so she can pay for driving lessons.

In March 2009, Dev refits one of his shops as a new art gallery for Tara and she launches it with the name No Oil Painting. Dev's uncle Umed (Harish Patel) voices concern that Tara is taking advantage of Dev's money and even suspects her of having a fling with Jason Grimshaw (Ryan Thomas), who is working on the refit. Tara begins to be dismayed when it becomes apparent that there is little interest in her new venture as nobody is buying her painting. Keen to please her, Dev has Minnie Chandra (Poppy Jhakra) to pose as a London art dealer who is interested in purchasing some work. Tara discovers Dev that has purchased the art after Minnie brings the art into the shop and she leaves, humiliated that Dev had made a fool of her. After her departure, Dev has a one-night stand with old flame Lisa Dalton (Ruth Alexander Rubin). To Dev's horror, Tara returns to the flat the following day to say how sorry she was, not knowing that Lisa was in the bedroom.  Dev and Lisa's night of passion is revealed to Tara by Poppy Morales (Sophiya Haque). Tara, disgusted, plans her revenge, tricking Dev into posing naked at a photoshoot. Tara unveils to the whole of Weatherfield the nude picture of Dev with the word 'LIAR' censoring him. Dev, who planned to propose to her that same day, argues with Tara in the flat before she packs her bags and leaves. Tara attempts to apologise to Amber, whom she is very fond of, but Amber refuses to listen.

References

Coronation Street characters
Television characters introduced in 2008
Female characters in television
Fictional Indian people